Mystery Science Theater 3000 is an American TV show which aired between 1988 and 1999, and began a new series in 2017. This page summarizes video tape and DVD releases of episodes of the show. Episodes were initially released by Rhino Entertainment, with the rights later being purchased by Shout! Factory. Releases usually consist of boxsets of 4 episodes, although early releases consisted of just single episodes.

As of November 2017, 166 of the series' 176 nationally broadcast episodes from the original series were released on home video, with the remaining unreleased episodes' host segments released separately due to licensing issues for the movies featured in them.

Any commercial release listed in grey indicates it is no longer in print from their respected company (Best Brains' mailing catalogue for their VHS tapes and DVDs, transferred to Mst3k.com, Rhino's VHS tapes and DVDs from their official website, and Shout! Factory's DVDs from their official website). Items listed in pink are re-releases from Shout! Factory, previously available from Rhino Home Video.

VHS releases
Rhino Home Video released several episodes from the Comedy Central era on VHS from April 1996 to January 2001. As of 2004, all of the tapes were out of print, but all episodes originally released on home video have been released on DVD, either as a single or part of a volume pack (except for 309 – The Amazing Colossal Man, due to licensing issues with the original movie).

Best Brains produced VHS tapes for independent sale through their info club newsletters. As of 2007, all of the tapes were out of print, but most of the tapes have been released as bonus features on DVD releases.

A listing of video tapes released is listed below.

Best Brains

Rhino

DVD releases

Rhino
Beginning in March 2000, Rhino started to release episodes of MST3K on DVD.

One MST3K volume pack (Volume 10) was discontinued two months after its initial release, due to licensing issues with Godzilla vs. Megalon. The volume pack was reissued by Rhino as Volume 10.2, with a new episode (The Giant Gila Monster) in its place.

As of 2010, all Rhino releases have been discontinued, due to the company no longer having the rights to distribute MST3K on home video.

A complete listing of releases is shown in the table below.

Shout! Factory
In January 2008, Best Brains transferred the worldwide home entertainment and digital download license for MST3K from Rhino to Shout! Factory.

Best Brains
Best Brains' DVDs originally from their fanclub, then available for purchase until the website changed in 2015 on mst3k.com.

Mystery Science Theater 3000: The Movie
The feature film Mystery Science Theater 3000: The Movie was released on VHS and laserdisc in 1997 by MCA/Universal Home Video. Image Entertainment released it on DVD in 1998, but was taken out of print by MCA/Universal Home Video in 2000. The Movie was re-released by Universal on May 6, 2008, and was released again in a Blu-ray/DVD combo pack by Shout! Factory on September 3, 2013.

The Blu-ray/DVD combo pack released by Shout! Factory has the following bonus features:

 The Making of Mystery Science Theater 3000: The Movie
 Mystery Science Theater 3000: The Movie: The Motion Picture Odyssey
 This Island Earth: 2 1/2 Years in the Making
 Deleted and Extended scenes
 Mystery Science Theater 3000: The Movie Press Kit
 Original Theatrical Trailer

References

See also
The Film Crew
List of Mystery Science Theater 3000 episodes
List of RiffTrax

Mystery Science Theater 3000
Lists of home video releases